{{Infobox sports club
|name = Moorabbin Kangaroos Football Club
|image = Moorabbin FC logo.png
|fullname = Moorabbin Kangaroos Football Club
|emblem = The Kangaroos|colours = Blue with white
|founded = 1982
|League = Southern Football League
|premierships = 1993, 2005, 2012
|Official website Official website
}}

The Moorabbin Kangaroos Football Club''' is an Australian rules football team that is located in the southern suburbs of Melbourne. The team is part of the Moorabbin West Cricket & Football Club, it participates in The Southern Football League is an Australian rules football league, based in the south and south eastern suburbs of Melbourne, Victoria.

History
The club first played in the Melbourne YCWNFA in 1982 til 1985. When that association folded at the end of 1985 the club moved to play in the Eastern Suburban Churches FA E grade in 1986. After four years the E grade closed down and the club was placed in the D grade competition. It was placed in the 5th Division when the Southern Football League absorbed the ESCFA in 1993. They won the premiership that year.

The team changed its name in 2003 to Moorabbin Kangaroos.

Premiership success also came in 3rd division in 2005 and 2012.

Senior Premierships
 Southern Football League
  1993, 2005, 2012

References

External links
  Club website
 Southern Football League Website

Australian rules football clubs in Melbourne
Southern Football League (Victoria)
1982 establishments in Australia
Australian rules football clubs established in 1982
Sport in the City of Bayside